"Ja Tebe Ljublu" is a popular song of Ruslana (winner of the Eurovision Song Contest 2004). Ruslana performed Ja Tebe Ljublu at Eurovision Song Contest 2005's Euroclub.

Ruslana songs
2003 songs
Songs written by Ruslana